Hammarby sjö (Swedish: "Lake Hammarby") is a watercourse in central Stockholm, Sweden.

Covering a surface of 34 hectares and having an average depth of 4.5 metres (maximum 6 metres), Hammarby sjö is supplied by a drainage area covering 159 hectares and contains 1,600,000 cubic metres of water. The importance of the water expanse has grown since the late 20th century as new residential areas have been constructed along its shores.

Four bridges stretch over Hammarby Sjö and connected bodies of water: Danviksbron, Skansbron, Skanstullsbron and Johanneshovsbron.

See also 
 Geography of Stockholm

References

External links 

Waterways in Sweden
Geography of Stockholm
Landforms of Stockholm County